The Flash Museum is a fictional museum that appears in comic books published by DC Comics. The museum is dedicated to the superheroes sharing the alias of the Flash, with its primary focus on Barry Allen. It first appeared in the 'B' story from The Flash #154 (August 1965), "Gangster Masquerade," created by John Broome and Carmine Infantino.

Fictional history
The museum has been destroyed and subsequently rebuilt several times during the careers of both Barry Allen and Wally West. The museum was originally located in Central City, but was relocated to Keystone City after the original was destroyed by Hunter Zolomon. The museum was last destroyed in The Flash (vol. 2) #196 (May 2003), and a rebuilt museum is shown in The Flash (vol. 2) #208 (May 2004). After the death of the fourth Flash (Bart Allen), a statue of him was constructed with a candlelight vigil in his memory being held shortly thereafter. Bart's statue was vandalized and later destroyed by Superman-Prime, who holds a grudge against Bart for his initial defeat during the events of Infinite Crisis.

The museum features various exhibits about the Flash, including his battles and his rogues gallery of foes. The museum also contains a working cosmic treadmill, the device that allows Flash to travel to other dimensions and across time. In addition to the exhibits, the Flash Museum houses a vast storage of various artifacts and weaponry that the Flash has encountered. Depending on the story, some of these weapons are actually part of public exhibits, and are occasionally used during a fight.

The museum's curator since its founding is Dexter Myles, a former Shakespearean actor given the job by Barry Allen after his assistance in foiling a robbery. The museum is depicted in JLA/Avengers #1 (September 2003), and is the site of a battle between the Scarlet Witch and Quicksilver against Black Canary, Blue Beetle, and Hawkman to retrieve the Wand of Watoomb, which is won by the Avengers after the Witch uses her chaos magic to knock out the other fighters.

In Justice League: Cry for Justice, Jay Garrick, Ray Palmer, and Freddy Freeman arrive at a destroyed Flash Museum where technology from the cosmic treadmill was stolen, and three of Jay's friends were killed.

Future versions
 In the Teen Titans story arc "Titans Tomorrow", set ten years in the future, the whole of Keystone City is converted into a huge Flash Museum. The adult Impulse uses the museum as a hideout.
 In the "Cobalt Blue" storyline, the Flash Museum is shown to exist in the 25th and 30th centuries. By the later era, the museum contains exhibits on the many Flashes of the previous 1,000 years. The new curators are a pair of robots named Dexter and Myles.
 Several years before the Legion of Superheroes are formed, the Flash Museum is a derelict wreck. This is because the current President of Earth, Thawne, despises the Allen genealogical line. Despite this, it hosts the functioning Cosmic Treadmill.

Other versions

Flashpoint
In the Flashpoint reality, Flash is not Central City's superhero. Instead the resident hero Citizen Cold has his own museum.

In other media

Television

Live Action
 The Flash Museum is referenced in the live-action series The Flash (1990 / CBS). In the episode "Fast Forward", Barry Allen is thrown 10 years into the future where Central City is ruled by the brutal dictator Nicholas Pike. Allen is taken to the headquarters of the resistance, where they keep a room full of Flash artifacts that they refer to as "the Flash museum." Among the artifacts are newspapers, the Mask of Rasputin (from the episode "Honor Among Thieves"), the Trickster's costume, the Ghostess's costume, Nightshade's costume (both from the episode "Ghost in the Machine"), and a replica Flash costume.
 The Flash Museum is referenced in the CW television series  The Flash (2014 / The CW) . Dexter Myles appears in the series. In the episode "Things You Can not Outrun", Barry Allen mentions that he "does not want to museum built in [his] name", when asked whether or not he helps people for the glory. In the season 1 finale, "Fast Enough," when Barry is running back in time, there are a few glimpses of future events, one of them being the Flash museum. The museum is mentioned in season 5 episodes "Nora" and "Blocked" and appears in a flashback of "The Death of Vibe". Between 2018 and 2024, the Flash Museum will be inaugurated in the same building as the S.T.A.R. Labs, with Mr. Myles becoming its curator. Some time in or before 2032, a section called the "Hall of Villains" was built. This area included a wide variety of equipment that the Flash's enemies had used, or in the case of some artifacts, gadgets Team Flash had developed to take them down.

Animation
The Flash Museum appears in the Justice League Unlimited episode "Flash and Substance". True to form, it is destroyed in the fight between the Flash, Batman, Orion, and several members of the Flash's rogues gallery. A huge statue of the Flash is built in front of the museum. Among the exhibits are Jay Garrick's helmet, the Kid Flash costume, some wax mannequins of Flash's enemies, Turtle Man, Gorilla Grodd, Top and others, one of Captain Boomerang's actual boomerangs, and a globe with a miniature Flash and Superman racing around it to commemorate their race in the Superman: The Animated Series episode "Speed Demons".

Film
In the animated movie Justice League: The Flashpoint Paradox, the Flash museum appears attacked by Captain Cold, Top, Captain Boomerang, Heat Wave and Mirror Master. However, Professor Zoom betrays the rogues and attaches bombs to them which cannot be removed. The plot is thwarted when the Justice League arrive and manage to dispose the bombs from each of the rogues.

Video games
The Flash Museum appears in DC Universe Online.

Comic Strips 
In a storyline of the comic strip Funky Winkerbean, The Flash Museum in Central City is a destination for a surprise trip planned for Darrin, a main character.

References

External links
 Flash Museum at Those Who Ride the Lightning
 Flash Museum entry on DCDatabaseProject

Central City (DC Comics)
Flash (comics)
Fictional museums
Fictional buildings and structures originating in comic books